Washington Township is a township in Jackson County, Kansas, USA.  As of the 2000 census, its population was 516.

Geography
Washington Township covers an area of 53.69 square miles (139.06 square kilometers); of this, 0.07 square miles (0.19 square kilometers) or 0.14 percent is water. The streams of Dutch Creek, Illinois Creek, James Creek, Salt Creek and Sullivan Creek run through this township.

Cities and towns
 Delia

Adjacent townships
 Adrian Township (north)
 Lincoln Township (northeast)
 Douglas Township (east)
 Grove Township, Shawnee County (southeast)
 Menoken Township, Shawnee County (southeast)
 Rossville Township, Shawnee County (south)
 Emmett Township, Pottawatomie County (west)
 St. Marys Township, Pottawatomie County (west)

Cemeteries
The township contains one cemetery, Delia.

References
 U.S. Board on Geographic Names (GNIS)
 United States Census Bureau cartographic boundary files

External links
 US-Counties.com
 City-Data.com

Townships in Jackson County, Kansas
Townships in Kansas